1188 Gothlandia, provisional designation , is a stony Florian asteroid from the inner regions of the asteroid belt, approximately 12 kilometers in diameter. Discovered by astronomer Josep Comas i Solà at the Fabra Observatory in 1930, the asteroid was later named after the ancient name of the Spanish autonomous community of Catalonia.

Discovery 

Gothlandia was discovered on 30 September 1930, by Catalan astronomer Josep Comas i Solà at the Fabra Observatory in Barcelona, Spain. It was independently discovered by Soviet Grigory Neujmin at Simeiz Observatory on 17 October 1930, and by K. Nakamura at Kyoto Observatory, Japan, on 18 October 1930. The Minor Planet Center, however, only credits the first discoverer.

Orbit and classification 

Gothlandia is a member of the Flora family, a giant asteroid family and the largest family of stony asteroids in the main-belt. It orbits the Sun in the inner main-belt at a distance of 1.8–2.6 AU once every 3 years and 3 months (1,184 days). Its orbit has an eccentricity of 0.18 and an inclination of 5° with respect to the ecliptic. The body's observation arc begins with its official discovery observation at Barcelona in 1930.

Physical characteristics 

In the SMASS classification, Gothlandia is a stony S-type asteroid, which corresponds to the overall spectral type for Florian asteroids.

Rotation period and poles 

Several rotational lightcurves of Gothlandia have been obtained from photometric observations since the 1990s. Lightcurve analysis gave a consolidated rotation period of 3.4916 hours with a brightness variation of 0.81 magnitude. A high brightness amplitude typically indicates a non-spherical shape.

Modeled lightcurves using data from the Uppsala Asteroid Photometric Catalogue (UAPC) and other sources gave a concurring period 3.491820 hours. In 2013, another modeled lightcurve obtained form photometric data collected by the Catalina Sky Survey also determined a spin axis of (334.0°, −84.0°) in ecliptic coordinates (λ, β).

Diameter and albedo 

According to the surveys carried out by the Infrared Astronomical Satellite IRAS, the Japanese Akari satellite and the NEOWISE mission of NASA's Wide-field Infrared Survey Explorer, Gothlandia measures between 11.19 and 14.255 kilometers in diameter and its surface has an albedo between 0.2065 and 0.41.

The Collaborative Asteroid Lightcurve Link derives an albedo of 0.2631 and a diameter of 12.46 kilometers based on an absolute magnitude of 11.59.

Naming 

This minor planet was named after the Spanish autonomous community of Catalonia, by its ancient, per-medieval name Gothlandia ("Land of the Goths"). The official naming citation was mentioned in The Names of the Minor Planets by Paul Herget in 1955.

References

External links 
 Asteroid Lightcurve Database (LCDB), query form (info )
 Dictionary of Minor Planet Names, Google books
 Asteroids and comets rotation curves, CdR – Observatoire de Genève, Raoul Behrend
 Discovery Circumstances: Numbered Minor Planets (1)-(5000) – Minor Planet Center
 
 

001188
Discoveries by Josep Comas Solà
Named minor planets
001188
19300930